The foreign relations of the Italian Republic are the Italian government's external relations with the outside world. Located in Europe, Italy has been considered a major Western power  since its unification in 1860. Its main allies are the NATO countries and the EU states, two entities of which Italy is a founding member. Italy was admitted to the United Nations in 1955, and it is a member and a strong supporter of a wide number of international organisations, such as the Organisation for Economic Co-operation and Development (OECD), the General Agreement on Tariffs and Trade and World Trade Organization (GATT and WTO), the Organization for Security and Co-operation in Europe (OSCE), the Council of Europe, and the Central European Initiative.

Its turns in the rotating presidency of international organisations include the Organization for Security and Co-operation in Europe, the G7 and the EU Council. Italy is also a recurrent non-permanent member of the UN Security Council. Italy is an important actor in the Mediterranean region and has close relations with the Romance-speaking countries in Europe and Latin America. Although it is a secular state, Rome hosts the Pope and the headquarters of the Catholic Church, which operates a large diplomatic system of its own. Italy is currently commanding various multinational forces and has significant troops deployed all over the world for peacekeeping missions, and for combating organized crime, illegal drug trade, human trafficking, piracy and terrorism.

History

National unification

The Risorgimento was the era from 1829 to 1870 that saw the emergence of a national consciousness. Italians achieved independence from Austria and from the House of Bourbon, securing national unification in 1861. The papacy called France to resist unification, fearing that giving up control of the Papal States would weaken the Church and allow the liberals to dominate conservative Catholics. Italy captured Rome in 1870 and later formed the Triple Alliance (1882) with Germany and Austria.

World War I

Italy defeated the Ottoman Empire in 1911–1912. By 1915, Italy had acquired in Africa a colony on the Red Sea coast (Eritrea), a large protectorate in Somalia and administrative authority in formerly Turkish Libya. Outside of Africa, Italy possessed a small concession in Tientsin in China (following the Boxer Rebellion) and the Dodecanese Islands off the coast of Turkey.

Austria took the offensive against the terms of the alliance and Italy decided to take part in World War I as a principal allied power with France and Great Britain.  Two leaders, Prime Minister Antonio Salandra and Foreign Minister Sidney Sonnino made the decisions; their primary motivation was seizure of territory from Austria, as secretly promised by Britain and France in the Treaty of London of 1915. Also, Italy occupied southern Albania and established a protectorate over Albania, which remained in place until 1920.

The Allies defeated the Austrian Empire in 1918 and Italy became one of the main winners of the war.  At the Paris Peace Conference in 1919, Prime Minister Vittorio Emanuele Orlando focused almost exclusively on territorial gains, but he got far less than he wanted, and Italians were bitterly resentful when they were denied control of the city of Fiume.  The conference, under the control of Britain, France and the United States refused to assign Dalmazia and Albania to Italy as had been promised in the Treaty of London.  Britain, France and Japan divided the German overseas colonies into mandates of their own, excluding Italy. Italy also gained no territory from the breakup of the Ottoman Empire.  Civil unrest erupted in Italy between nationalists who supported the war effort and opposed what they called the "mutilated victory" (as nationalists referred to it) and leftists who were opposed to the war.

Fascism (1922–43)

The Fascist government that came to power with Benito Mussolini in 1922 sought to increase the size of the Italian empire and to satisfy the claims of Italian irredentists. In 1935–36, in its second invasion of Ethiopia Italy was successful and merged its new conquest with its older east African colonies. In 1939, Italy invaded Albania and incorporated it into the Fascist state. During the Second World War (1939–45), Italy formed the axis alliance with Germany (and nominally also Japan). It seized several territories (including parts of France, Greece, Egypt and Tunisia). By war's end it was forced out of all its colonies and protectorates.

Republican era

Following the civil war on 1943–1945 and the resulting economic depression, Italy became a republic after a referendum, enjoyed an economic miracle, joined NATO and became a founding member of the European Union. Italy was granted a United Nations trust to administer Somaliland in 1950. When Somalia became independent in 1960, Italy's eight-decade experience with colonialism ended.

Relations by region and country

Africa

Americas

Asia

Europe

Oceania

International institutions
Italy is part of the UN, EU, NATO, the OECD, the OSCE, the DAC, the WTO, the G7, the G20, the Union for the Mediterranean, the Latin Union, the Council of Europe, the Central European Initiative, the ASEM, the MEF, the ISA, the Uniting for Consensus and several Contact Groups.

See also

 Diplomatic history of World War II#Italy
 International relations of the Great Powers (1814–1919)
List of diplomatic missions in Italy
List of diplomatic missions of Italy
Treaty of Osimo, 1975 with Yugoslavia
Treaty of Rapallo, 1920
Visa requirements for Italian citizens
List of international trips made by prime ministers of Italy

References

Further reading

Pre 1945
 Azzi,  Stephen Corrado. "The Historiography of Fascist Foreign Policy," Historical Journal (1993) 36#1 pp. 187–203 in JSTOR
 Bosworth, Richard. Italy and the wider world 1860-1960 (2013)  excerpt
 Bosworth, Richard. Italy: The Least of the Great Powers: Italian Foreign Policy Before the First World War (1979) 
 Bosworth, Richard. Mussolini (2002)  excerpt and text search
 Burgwyn, H. James. The legend of the mutilated victory: Italy, the Great War, and the Paris Peace Conference, 1915-1919 (1993).
 Burgwyn, H. James. Italian Foreign Policy in the Interwar Period, 1918-1940 (1997) excerpt and text search
 Cassels, Alan. Italian Foreign Policy, 1918-1945: A Guide to Research and Research Materials (1997)
 Chabod, Federico. Italian Foreign Policy: The Statecraft of the Founders, 1870-1896 (1996)  excerpt and text search
 Gooch, John. Mussolini and his Generals: The Armed Forces and Fascist Foreign Policy, 1922-1940 (2007) excerpt and text search
 Knox, MacGregor. Common Destiny: Dictatorship, Foreign Policy, and War in Fascist Italy and Nazi Germany (2000)
 Lowe, C. J. and F. Marzari. Italian Foreign Policy, 1870-1940 (2001) online
 Maurizio Marinelli, Giovanni Andornino. Italy's Encounter with Modern China: Imperial dreams, strategic ambitions (New York: Palgrave Macmillan, 2014).
 Maurizio Marinelli, "The Genesis of the Italian Concession in Tianjin: A Combination of Wishful Thinking and Realpolitik". Journal of Modern Italian Studies, 15 (4), 2010: 536–556.
 Sette, Alessandro. "L'Albania nella strategia diplomatica italiana (1871-1915)", Nuova Rivista Storica, Vol. CII, n. 1 (2018), 321–378.
 Smith, Denis Mack. Modern Italy: A Political History (1997)
 Taylor, A.J.P. The Struggle for Mastery in Europe 1848–1918 (1954), covers all European diplomacy

Since 1945
 Barberini, Pierluigi. "What strategy for Italy in the Mediterranean basin: rethinking the Italian approach to foreign, security and defense policy." (2020). online
 Baraggia, Antonia. "The Italian regions in the European Union." in Federalism and Constitutional Law: The Italian Contribution to Comparative Regionalism (2021).
 Cladi, Lorenzo, and Mark Webber. "Italian foreign policy in the post-cold war period: a neoclassical realist approach." European security 20.2 (2011): 205–219.
 Cladi, Lorenzo, and Andrea Locatelli. "Explaining Italian foreign policy adjustment after Brexit: a Neoclassical realist account." Journal of European Integration 43.4 (2021): 459–473.
 Collina, Cristian. "A bridge in times of confrontation: Italy and Russia in the context of EU and NATO enlargements." Journal of Modern Italian Studies 13.1 (2008): 25–40.
 Coticchia, Fabrizio, and Jason W. Davidson. Italian Foreign Policy During Matteo Renzi's Government: A Domestically Focused Outsider and the World (Rowman & Littlefield, 2019).
 Coticchia, Fabrizio, and Valerio Vignoli. "Italian Foreign Policy: Still the Days Seem the Same?." in Foreign policy change in Europe Since 1991 (Palgrave Macmillan, Cham, 2021) pp. 179–204.
 Coticchia, Fabrizio, and Francesco Niccolò Moro. "From enthusiasm to retreat: Italy and military missions abroad after the Cold War." Italian Political Science 15.1 (2020): 114–131.
 Coticchia, Fabrizio. "A sovereignist revolution? Italy’s foreign policy under the “Yellow–Green” government." Comparative European Politics 19.6 (2021): 739-759. online
 Coticchia, Fabrizio, and Jason W. Davidson. "The limits of radical parties in coalition foreign policy: Italy, hijacking, and the extremity hypothesis." Foreign Policy Analysis 14.2 (2018): 149–168.
 Croci, Osvaldo. "The ‘Americanization’ of Italian foreign policy?" Journal of Modern Italian Studies 10.1 (2005): 10–26.
 Cusumano, Eugenio, and Kristof Gombeer. "In deep waters: The legal, humanitarian and political implications of closing Italian ports to migrant rescuers." Mediterranean Politics 25.2 (2020): 245–253. online
 Dentice, Giuseppe, and Federico Donelli. "Reasserting (middle) power by looking southwards: Italy’s policy towards Africa." Contemporary Italian Politics 13.3 (2021): 331–351.
 Diodato, Emidio, and Federico Niglia. Berlusconi ‘The Diplomat’: Populism and Foreign Policy in Italy (Springer, 2018).
 Faherty, Douglas M. Italian Foreign Policy: Trends for the Twenty-First Century (2012)  excerpt
 Giuntini, Federico Mariano. "Italian 'Yellow-Green Government' and the European Union: a complicated relationship." Journal of Governance and Politics 2 (2019): 19+
 Lupo, Nicola, and Giovanni Piccirilli, eds. The Italian Parliament in the European Union (Oxford: Hart Publishing, 2017)
 Natalizia, Gabriele, and Mara Morini. "Sleeping with the enemy: The not-so-constant Italian stance towards Russia." Italian Political Science 15.1 (2020): 42–59. online
 Prontera, Andrea. "Italy, Russia and the Great Reconfiguration in East–West Energy Relations." Europe-Asia Studies 73.4 (2021): 647–672.
 Ratti, Luca. "Italy and NATO in the 21st century: Still a formidable partnership?" in NATO and Transatlantic Relations in the 21st Century (Routledge, 2020) pp. 188–206.
 Siddi, Marco. "Italy-Russia relations: Politics, energy and other businesses." ast European (2012): 73+ online.